The Basra governorate election of 2013 was held on 20 April 2013 alongside elections for all other governorates outside Iraqi Kurdistan, Kirkuk, Anbar, and Nineveh.

Results 

|- style="background-color:#E9E9E9"
!align="left" colspan=2 valign=top|Party/Coalition!! Allied national parties !! Leader !!Seats !! Change !!Votes !! % !! ±%
|-
|bgcolor="#FF0000"|
|align=left|State of Law Coalition || align=left| Islamic Dawa Party ||Nouri Al-Maliki|| 16 || 4 || 292,658 || 45.17% || 8.18%
|-
|bgcolor="#009933"|
|align=left|Citizens Alliance ||align=left|ISCI|| Ammar al-Hakim|| 6 || 1 || 121,875 || 18.81% || 7.22%
|-
|bgcolor="#000000"|
|align=left|Liberal Coalition|| align=left|Liberal BlocTribal Forces CoalitionSadrist Movement ||Dhia Najim al-Asadi || 3 || 1 || 58,312 ||9.00% || 4.04%
|-
|
|align=left|Basra Independent Coalition||align=left|Kafaat al-IraqNational FidelityLoyalty to NajafICICSO || || 2 || 2 || 29,384 || 4.54% || 4.54%
|-
|bgcolor="#FFFF00"|
|align=left|Gathering of Justice and Unity ||align=left|Movement for Justice & DevelopmentDemocratic MovementLabour & National Salvation CoalitionPeople's PartyNational MeetingNDPIraqi Communist Party || al-Faiz || 1 || 1 || 24,513 || 3.78% || 0.38%
|-
|
|align=left|Al Barsa’s Civil Alliance || || || 1 || 1 || 17,541 || 2.71% ||
|-
|
|align=left|Alternative Movement || || || 1 || 1 || 15,643 || 2.41% ||
|-
|bgcolor="#286F42"|
|align=left|Islamic Dawa Party – Iraq Organisation || || || 1 || 1 || 15,493 || 2.39% ||
|-
|
|align=left|Will of Iraq Movement || || || 1 || 1 || 13,940 || 2.15% ||
|-
|bgcolor="#098DCD"|
|align=left|Al Iraqia National and United Coalition || || || 1 || 1 || 13,319 || 2.06% ||
|-
|bgcolor="#0D4E76"|
|align=left|Muttahidoon || || || 1 || 1 || 10,386 || 1.60% ||
|-
|bgcolor="#6398FE"|
|align=left|National White Bloc || || || || || 8,247 || 1.27% || 1.27%
|-
|
|align=left|Al Basra’s People || || || || || 8,246 || 1.27% ||
|-
|
|align=left|New Dawn Bloc|| || || || || 4,115 || 0.64% ||
|-
|
|align=left|Iraqi Council for Reform and Change|| || || || || 3,536 || 0.55% ||
|-
|bgcolor="#F6BE22"|
|align=left|Iraq’s Benevolence and Generosity List || || || ||  || 2,568 || 0.40% ||
|-
|
|align=left|Iraq’s Advocates for State Support || || || ||  || 1,782 || 0.28% ||
|-
|
|align=left|Islamic Advocates’ Party|| || || || || 1,671 || 0.26% ||
|-
|bgcolor="#DDDDDD"|
|align=left|Novac Aram Butrosian Abu Mariana||align=left|Independent || || || || 1,165 || 0.18% ||
|-
|bgcolor="#DDDDDD"|
|align=left|Alaa’ Fawzi Kamel Tutunji||align=left|Independent || || || || 812 || 0.13% ||
|-
|bgcolor="#DDDDDD"|
|align=left|Doctor Saad Mitri Botros||align=left|Independent || || || || 643 || 0.10% ||
|-
|bgcolor="#DDDDDD"|
|align=left|Mohammad Al Maryani ||align=left|Independent || || ||  || 592 || 0.09% ||
|-
|
|align=left|Chaldean Syriac Assyrian Gathering Coalition|| || || || || 588 || 0.09% ||
|-
|bgcolor="#DDDDDD"|
|align=left|Legal Advisor Sanaa’ Al Asadi ||align=left|Independent || || ||  || 565 || 0.09% ||
|-
|bgcolor="#DDDDDD"|
|align=left|Na’el Ghanem Aziz Hanna||align=left|Independent || || || || 343 || 0.05% ||
|-
|- style="background-color:#E9E9E9"
|colspan=2 align=left|Total || || || 35 || - || 647,937 || 100%
|-
|colspan=7 align=left|Sources: Musings on Iraq, ISW, IHEC Basra Results, List of political coalition approved for election in provincial councils - IHEC , al-Sumaria - Basra Coalitions

Local government formation
On 13 June 2013 Majid al-Nasrawi of the Citizen's Alliance was elected as the new Governor of Basra. Khalaf Abdul Samad, of the State of Law Coalition, was elected as Chairman of the Basra Provincial Council.

References 

2013 Iraqi governorate elections